Kenneth Peter Jungels (June 23, 1916 – September 9, 1975) was a Major League Baseball pitcher who played for five seasons. He played for the Cleveland Indians from 1937 to 1938 and 1940 to 1941 and the Pittsburgh Pirates in 1942.

Jungels' lone victory came on August 14, 1938, as a relief pitcher in the Indians 6–4 win over the Chicago White Sox. During World War II, he served stateside in the army. He died in West Bend, Wisconsin on September 9, 1975.

References

External links

1916 births
1975 deaths
Cleveland Indians players
Pittsburgh Pirates players
Major League Baseball pitchers
Baseball players from Illinois
Burials in Wisconsin
People from West Bend, Wisconsin
Sportspeople from Aurora, Illinois
United States Army personnel of World War II